Kachak Ali (also Romanized as Kachaḵ ʿAlī; also known as Kūch Kālī) is a village in Neh Rural District, in the Central District of Nehbandan County, South Khorasan Province, Iran. At the 2006 census, its population was 37, in 7 families.

References 

Populated places in Nehbandan County